Aknystos is a village in Anykščiai district municipality, in Utena County, in northeast Lithuania. According to the 2011 census, the village has a population of 238 people. Village established on Aknysta river. First time mentioned in 1538.

References

Anykščiai District Municipality
Villages in Utena County